The New Times is a Russian language magazine in Russia. The magazine was founded in 1943. The current version, established in 1988, is a liberal, independent Russian weekly news magazine, publishing for Russia and Armenia. (During the Soviet times it was a multi-language political magazine which followed the official party line.) Its chief editor is Russian investigative journalist, political scientist, writer and radio host Yevgenia Albats.

The magazine contains articles on politics, economics, social life and journalist investigations. Columnists provide the readers with their opinions regarding recent news and events.

In 2017 the magazine ceased its print publication and became an online-only publication.

After an interview of Yevgenia Albats with opposition politician Alexei Navalny, aired on Echo of Moscow, The New Times faced a 22 million ruble fine in October 2018. The fine amount (almost $370,000) was crowd-funded in four days.

On 28 February 2022, Roskomnadzor blocked the website of the channel for its coverage of the Russian invasion of Ukraine.

References

External links
 
 

1943 establishments in the Soviet Union
Eastern Bloc mass media
Magazines established in 1943
Russian-language magazines
News magazines published in Russia
Political magazines published in Russia
Magazines published in the Soviet Union
Weekly magazines published in Russia
Magazines published in Moscow
Free Media Awards winners